Martín Miguel Vassallo Argüello (born 10 February 1980) is a retired professional male tennis player from Argentina. His career-high ATP singles ranking is World No. 47, achieved in April 2009 shortly after reaching the semifinals of Acapulco.

Tennis career
He turned pro in 1999. Over the course of his career, he has represented both Argentina and Italy.

At the 2006 French Open, he reached the fourth round of a Grand Slam event for the first time in his career. He entered the tournament as a qualifier and beat Paul Goldstein of the United States in the first round in straight sets, No. 21 seed Sébastien Grosjean of France in the second round in five sets and Raemon Sluiter of the Netherlands in the third round, also in five sets. In the next round he lost to David Nalbandian.

In late 2007, at the Orange Prokom Open in Sopot, Poland, Argüello was embroiled in a betting scandal after his match against world number four Nikolay Davydenko. The match saw Davydenko retire with the scores at 2–6, 6–3, 2–1. Gamblers betting on the match displayed irregular betting patterns and a total of £3.4m was paid out on it, ten times the normal amount for a match at this level. Eventually, Betfair voided all bets on the match. Neither Argüello nor Davydenko have been formally charged with any offence by the ATP.

According to a BBC report, a follow-up investigation revealed that Argüello had exchanged messages with a Sicilian gambler in 2006, including on the morning of a tennis match which saw the gambler win $86,000. Deleted messages recovered from Argüello's phone included "He doesn't want to do it. He intends to win", followed by "All okay" just before the game.

In 2009, Vassallo made his Davis Cup debut for Argentina in the 5-0 defeat against The Netherlands in Buenos Aires playing doubles with Lucas Arnold Ker and in the reverse singles.

Singles titles

Performance timeline

Notes

References

External links
 
 
 Vassallo World ranking history

1980 births
Living people
Argentine male tennis players
People from Temperley
Tennis players from Buenos Aires